Pierre Gouget (22 March 1932 – 6 July 2003) was a French cyclist who specialized in road racing. In 1952 he finished second in the Tour de Paris. In 1955 he won one stage of the Peace Race. Next year he won the Tour de Normandie and Tour de l'Ouest. He retired in 1960.

References 

1932 births
2003 deaths
French male cyclists
Sportspeople from Calvados (department)
Cyclists from Normandy